Ballad Nerd Pop is the debut studio album by American alternative rock band Paperdoll. It was recorded in 2008 at Bushwick Studios, Brooklyn with producer Nic Hard (The Bravery, Aberdeen City).

Paperdoll first received national attention when the first song on the album, If Nothing Happened, appeared in a TV commercial for Vicks Dayquil in October, 2009.

Track listing
All tracks by T. Chaisiri except where noted

 "If Nothing Happened" – 3:00
 "I Know" (Chaisiri, Patrick Moloney) – 3:55
 "Get To Know Me" – 3:19
 "Anything At All – 3:12
 "How Perfect" – 3:23
 "She Said" – 3:37
 "Nothing Has Changed" (Moloney) – 3:02
 "Everything Is Fine" – 3:24
 "Wiser" – 2:49
 "Beautiful Face" – 3:37

Personnel 

Teresa Lee – vocals, keyboard
Patrick Moloney – guitar, vocals
Jack Koch – bass
Chip Thomas – drums

References

2008 debut albums
Paperdoll (band) albums